Ian Alexander Dobbins (born 24 August 1983) is a Scottish former footballer, who played for Albion Rovers, Hamilton Academical, Dumbarton, Arbroath, Montrose and Stranraer.

References

1983 births
Scottish footballers
Dumbarton F.C. players
Albion Rovers F.C. players
Hamilton Academical F.C. players
Arbroath F.C. players
Montrose F.C. players
Stranraer F.C. players
Scottish Football League players
Living people
Association football midfielders